Tadepalligudem is a city in West Godavari district of the Indian state of Andhra Pradesh. It is a Selection Grade municipality and the mandal headquarters of Tadepalligudem mandal and Tadepalligudem Revenue Division. Tadepalligudem is the second biggest city after Bhimavaram in West Godavari District as per 2011 census in terms of population.

Geography
It has an average elevation of 34 metres (114 feet).

Demographics
 Census of India, the city had a population of 130,348. The total population constitute, 65,045 males and 65,305 females — a sex ratio of 1022 females per 1000 males - higher than the national average of 940 per 1000. 9,048 children are in the age group of 0–6 years, of which 4,662 are boys and 4,386 are girls—a ratio of 941 per 1000. The average literacy rate stands at 83.10% (male 86.60%; female 79.71%) with 78,557 literates, significantly higher than the national average of 73.00%.

The urban agglomeration had a population of 135,032 of which males constitute 67,028 and females constitute 68,004 — a sex ratio of 1024 females per 1000 males - and 9,061 children are in the age group of 0–6 years. There are a total of 78,656 literates with an average literacy rate of 83.11%.

Civil Administration and Politics 
Tadepalligudem Municipality was formed in the year 1958. The present municipal commissioner of the town is P. Balaswamy and the present chairman is Vacant. 
There is a police station and sub-registrar office in the town.

Tadepalligudem (Assembly constituency) represents Andhra Pradesh Legislative Assembly, which is one of the segment of Narasapuram (Lok Sabha constituency), representing the Lok Sabha. The present MLA of Tadepalligudem is Sri. Kottu Satyanarayan serving from 2019.

Education 

The primary and secondary school education is imparted by government, aided and private schools of the School Education Department of the state. National Institute of Technology, Tadepalligudem is the 31st NIT in the country, for which the foundation stone was laid in the town on 20 August 2015. Dr. YSR Horticulture University and Adikavi nannayya university campus are other major universities in Tadepalligudem. Other important engineering colleges are 
Sri Vasavi Engineering college which helps students in building their career and gives highest placements and mainly SVEC concentrates on R&D, Sasi Engineering college, VISIT Engineering college, WISE Engineering college, ASR Homeopathic Hospital and Medical college, Vasavi YSRBS degree and PG college, Dr.Goenka Women’s college, Pentapadu degree college, Government Polytechnic college, Sri Vasavi institute of Pharmaceutical Sciences etc.,

Transport 
Asian Highway 45 passes through the town, which is a part of the Golden Quadrilateral project. The Andhra Pradesh State Road Transport Corporation operates bus services from Tadepalligudem bus station. Tadepalligudem railway station is located on Visakhapatnam–Vijayawada section of Howrah-Chennai main line. It is one of the thirteen A – category stations located in Vijayawada railway division of South Central Railway zone. Almost all the trains passing through Tadepalligudem have stoppages here. Tadepalligudem has an airport which is currently not in use, built by the British to accommodate military aircraft during World War II. In 1942. The Government of Andhra Pradesh proposed an airport in Tadepalligudem along with five other cities. Rajahmundry Airport is the nearest airport. There is bus connectivity to Tanuku, Bhimavaram, Rajamahendravaram, Ravulapalem and Eluru. There are other AP state buses to Visakhapatnam every day.

Climate 

Tadepalligudem experiences hot and humid climate due to its proximity to the shore of Bay of Bengal. May is the very hottest and December is the coolest month of the year. Temperature crosses  in summer.

Media
Eenadu and Sakshi, Andhra Jyothi, Vaartha, The New Indian Express (English) etc., daily newspapers are published from Tadepalligudem.

See also 
List of cities in Andhra Pradesh by population
List of municipalities in Andhra Pradesh

References

External links 
Tadepalligudem bus timings

Cities in Andhra Pradesh
Mandal headquarters in West Godavari district
Travel